The Joburg Open is a men's professional golf tournament that is held in Johannesburg, South Africa. It is an event on the Southern Africa-based Sunshine Tour and co-sanctioned by the European Tour, which attracts a larger prize fund and stronger fields. It is one of several tournaments in South Africa on the European Tour's international schedule, and until 2017 was one of the events where high-finishing players earned entry into The Open Championship if not already exempt.

History
The event was founded in 2007 and was played at the Royal Johannesburg & Kensington Golf Club in Johannesburg, South Africa until 2017. The tournament was contested over both the West and East courses for the first two rounds, enabling a large field of 210 competitors, with the final two rounds being played over the East course following a cut to the top 65 and ties.

Originally contested in January or February, the tournament moved to December in late 2017 and became a tri-sanctioned event with the Asian Tour joining the European Tour and the Sunshine Tour in sanctioning the event; the number of players in the field increased from 210 to 240. The December 2017 event was part of the 2018 European Tour. Having not been held in 2018 or 2019, in October 2020 it was announced that the tournament would be revived in November 2020, when it would be played at Randpark Golf Club.

The 2021 event was shortened due to COVID-19 travel restrictions in place in the UK from South Africa. Originally the event was shortened to 54 holes to allow international players to travel back home in time. However, the following day rain and the threat of lightning shortened the event even further to 36 holes. Thriston Lawrence was the eventual winner.

Winners

Notes

References

External links

Coverage on the European Tour's official site
Coverage on the Asian Tour's official site
Coverage on the Sunshine Tour's official site

Sunshine Tour events
European Tour events
Former Asian Tour events
Golf tournaments in South Africa
Sports competitions in Johannesburg
Recurring sporting events established in 2007
2007 establishments in South Africa